Nicholas Joseph Ricci (born June 3, 1959) is a Canadian former professional ice hockey goaltender. He played 19 games for the Pittsburgh Penguins of the National Hockey League (NHL), playing most of his career in the American Hockey League and International Hockey League.

Playing career
Born in Niagara Falls, Ontario, Ricci played junior hockey for the Niagara Falls Flyers of the Ontario Hockey Association. He was drafted 94th overall in the 1979 NHL Entry Draft by the Pittsburgh Penguins and signed with their organization that summer. He played the 1979-80 season for the Grand Rapids Owls of the IHL, and was called up to the Penguins to play four games. For the next three seasons, Ricci played several games each year for the Penguins, but played mostly in the minors. In 1983, he was traded to the Toronto Maple Leafs, joining the Leafs' AHL affiliate, the  St. Catharines Saints. He split the 1983–84 season with the Saints and the Muskegon Mohawks of the IHL, and played one final season in the IHL in 1984–85 with the Peoria Rivermen.

Awards
 1979 F. W. "Dinty" Moore Trophy - OMJHL Award for top rookie goaltender
 1979 Dave Pinkney Trophy (shared with Glen Ernst) - OMJHL award to team with best goals against average.

References

External links

1959 births
Living people
Canadian people of Italian descent
Ice hockey people from Ontario
Niagara Falls Flyers players
Pittsburgh Penguins draft picks
Pittsburgh Penguins players
Sportspeople from Niagara Falls, Ontario
Canadian ice hockey goaltenders